The 2006 EHF European Men's Handball Championship was the seventh tournamentof the tournament and held in Switzerland from 26 January to 5 February 2006, in the cities of Basel, Berne, Lucerne, St. Gallen and Zürich. France won the tournament, going through unbeaten after an early defeat to Spain. France's defence conceded the fewest goals per game in the entire tournament, with 192 conceded goals in eight matches. The hosts Switzerland were knocked out at the first group stage, while Denmark finished third and Croatia fourth to qualify directly for the 2007 World Championship, along with France.

Qualification

Note: Bold indicates champion for that year. Italic indicates host for that year.

Preliminary round

Group A
This group was played in the Kreuzbleichhalle, St. Gallen (capacity: 4,500). Poland qualified first, winning the first match and then drawing the second against Switzerland despite an equaliser with 15 seconds to go from Pascal Jenny, and two hours later they were joined by Slovenia, who came back from a two-goal deficit in the last ten minutes to beat Ukraine by 33–31. Switzerland and Ukraine thus played off for the last place in the main round, and the Swiss got behind from the start, trailing by 21–14 at half time. Ten minutes into the second half, Ukraine were 28–16 up, before allowing Switzerland somewhat back into it near the end. They still won 37–30, however, qualifying for the second round with zero points. Slovenia beat Poland 33–29 to carry forward four points, while Poland got two.

Group B
The matches in this group were played in St. Jakobshalle, Basel (capacity 8,500). Germany became the first team to qualify, drawing their first match with Spain before overcoming Slovakia (who ended up by conceding 100 goals, the most in the group stage) in their second game. Spain followed soon after, beating France by 29–26 after a 17–9 lead at half time, but the French were also through as they would be ahead of Slovakia on head-to-head if the two were to end on two points each. Thus, their last match with Germany only determined how many points they would carry forward to the main round; France risked going through with nil, but after prevailing 27–25 they finished the group in second place and took two points.

Group C
The matches in this group were held in the Sursee Stadthalle in Sursee/Lucerne. Denmark and Iceland opened with wins, and with a draw in the second round both teams qualified for the main round. Serbia and Montenegro joined them due to the head-to-head encounter rule; despite finishing level on points with Hungary after losing to Denmark in the last match, Serbia and Montenegro had beaten Hungary and thus finished ahead. Iceland lost their last match, but nevertheless carried through three points to the main round, as did Denmark.

Group D
This group was played out in the Wankdorfhalle, Berne. Russia became the first team to qualify for the main round when they beat Portugal on 27 January. Croatia joined them later that day with a 32–28 win over Norway, and Norway and Portugal played off for the last main round spot on Sunday 29 January. Norway won that match by ten goals, thus proceeding to the main round with zero points; Russia got a full score with four points, despite nearly throwing away a five-goal lead in the last five minutes against Croatia.

Main round
Results from the first group stage were carried forward into the main round.
The first and second placed teams from each group advance to the semifinals. The third placed team of each group advance to play for the fifth place in the tournament.

Group I
The matches in this group were played in St. Jakobshalle, Basel. Slovenia had gone through their group with four points from their two matches, but lost initially to France, who were second after two matches. Indeed, Group B teams dominated this group; all nine matches in the second round were won by teams from Group B, and Germany's 36–22 win over Ukraine in the first round of main round play was the largest all tournament. Ukraine were thus knocked out of the semis with two games to play.

Germany continued on the winning path the following day, taking a four-goal lead at half-time against Slovenia in a rerun of the 2004 final, before Slovenia pegged them back to 27–27 midway through the second half. The following nine minutes gave the Germans a five-goal advantage, with keeper Henning Fritz conceding one goal in those nine minutes, and with five minutes to spare Slovenia could only come back to a three-goal deficit. Nevertheless, Germany were still third in the group, as France beat Poland by ten goals and Spain were eventually pegged back to 31–29 by Ukraine after conceding five goals without reply in the last seven minutes. However, Ukraine missed a penalty shot from Konstantyyn Tkhorevskyy and Spain prevailed.

The final round of matches opened with Germany beating Poland by eight goals, winning the first half by 16–7 and controlling from there, as their keeper Johannes Bitter saved 21 shots. By contrast, the two Polish keepers had an aggregate of six saves. However, Germany needed either France or Spain to lose their matches, and France would not oblige; they beat Ukraine by 30–20 to qualify for the semi-finals. Spain needed a draw against Slovenia to qualify, and the teams were within two goals of each other for most of the first half. The Spanish goalkeeper made four saves in the final five minutes of the first half, allowing Spain to get a 19–16 lead, and Slovenia never came closer than two goals after that. Spain thus qualified for the semi-finals in first place, ahead of France, while Germany played off for fifth place and a spot at the 2008 European Championship.

Group II
This group's matches took place in the Kreuzbleichhalle, St. Gallen.

Iceland took an early lead in this group after beating Russia 34–32 in the first match, which sent Russia down from first to third place. Croatia went second in the group after beating Denmark, left winger Goran Šprem settling the match when he scored two seconds before the end, while Norway were the only team without a point in this group after losing their match with Serbia and Montenegro. With 25 seconds remaining, Kristian Kjelling scored a penalty to equalise, but Milorad Krivokapić scored his only goal of the match just as the buzzer sounded to give Serbia and Montenegro the victory.

Russia quickly recovered from the loss against Iceland, with their keeper Alexei Kostygov saving 14 of 34 shots as Serbia/Montenegro were beaten 29–21, and went top of the table ahead of Croatia – who beat Iceland by one goal, though Iceland's last two goals came in the very last minute. In the last match on 1 February, Denmark kept their semi-final hopes alive with a 35–31 win over Norway, to stay within one point of the leaders.

The following day saw Croatia become the first team to qualify for the semi-finals when they beat Serbia and Montenegro by 34–30; the teams followed each other until 20–20 ten minutes into the second half, when wingers Goran Šprem and Mirza Džomba scored five of six successive Croatian goals. Goalkeeper Vlado Šola saved 19 of 43 shots from Serbian players. Iceland needed a win against Norway, who had failed to win a match thus far in the tournament, and led 16–14 at half time after Norway threw away the ball on their last attack of the half and Iceland countered in a last goal. Norway came back, equalising eight minutes into the second half, and with ten minutes to go they took a three-goal lead which they never relinquished, eventually winning 36–33 to knock Iceland out of the championship. Norwegian back player Kjetil Strand scored 19 goals in the match, eight more than any other player had done in a match thus far in the tournament, and more than half of Norway's goals.

The final match between Russia and Denmark was now a virtual quarter-final. Russia gained a 6–3 lead after ten minutes, but were pegged back, and by the end of the half it was 13–13. In the second half, Russia suffered three two-minute suspensions within a minute, and during the three-minute period of Danish numerical superiority they went from 19–17 to 22–17. The lead never shrunk below five goals again, Denmark eventually scoring 22 goals in the second half to win 35–28 and qualify for the semi-finals in second place.

Final round
These took place in the largest stadium to be used in the tournament, the Hallenstadion in Zürich (capacity 11,500). The first match was the fifth-place play-off, determining the final direct qualifying spot for the 2008 European Men's Handball Championship; the other semi-finalists had already qualified directly. Russia took a two-goal lead through Oleg Frolov when he gave them 6–4 in the ninth minute, and Germany failed to catch up before half-time, though they won the last eight minutes 5–3. Russia went into the break with an 18–16 lead, but failed to score for eight minutes midway through the second half, while Christian Zeitz scored four successive goals for Germany to take them into a three-goal lead, which they kept for the remainder of the match despite Eduard Kokcharov scoring two penalties with five minutes to go. Zeitz ended up with 12 goals, eight of which came in the second half.

In the first of the two semi-finals, France faced Croatia, and after Croatia won the first 20 minutes by 10–8 the French goalkeeper Thierry Omeyer shut the goal. Nine saves were recorded before half-time, as France went into a 12–10 lead, and a further two in the first five minutes of the second half allowed France to build a four-goal lead. They never gave it away again, as Michael Guigou netted six times in the second half to ensure a 29–23 victory.

Spain became the second team from preliminary group B to qualify for the final, coming back from a 15–16 deficit at half time when Iker Romero scored four successive goals for Spain to bring them from 20–19 to 24–20. Denmark came within one goal, when Lars Rasmussen netted on a fast break, but three Spanish goals and two saves followed, and the Danes never came back in the match.

Denmark won the third place play-off, however, coming back from 2–5 down to lead 16–9 at half time against Croatia and eventually winning by five goals, before France went into the final against the defending World Champions Spain. France had lost the group stage match by three goals, and Spain took a 4–1 lead after five minutes, before a four-minute rally from France brought them back in the lead. Spain were catching up for the most part of the first half, equalising four times but not taking the lead until Iker Romero scored a penalty shot in the 21st minute. France then won the last nine minutes of the half by 6–1, and went into the break with a four-goal lead.

Coming out of the break, Spain came within two goals, trailing by 20–22 when ten minutes had passed. However, they then went nearly fifteen minutes without a goal, which included a period of playing with six men against four. When Rolando Urios finally scored, France still led by 28–21 with six minutes to go, and France eventually won the match by 31–23 to win their first European Championship.

Bracket

Semifinals

Fifth place game

Third place game

Final

Ranking and statistics

Final ranking

All-Star Team

Source: EHF

Top goalscorers

Source: EHF

Top goalkeepers
(minimum 20% of total shots received by team)

Source: EHF

References

External links
Results

European Handball
H
H
European Men's Handball Championship
European Men's Handball Championship
European Men's Handball Championship